Bada Valley or Napu Valley, located in the Lore Lindu National Park in Central Sulawesi, Indonesia, contains hundreds of megaliths going back to the 14th century that are called watu ("stone") in the local Badaic languages and arca ("statue") in Indonesian. The purpose of the megaliths and their builders are unknown.

History
The megaliths in the Bada Valley were first discovered in 1908. Although the discovery has been going on for more than 100 years, little is known about the object, including when the stone statue was made. Some have speculated that the stones were carved around 5,000 years ago, while others think the megaliths were created around 2,000 years ago.

Meanwhile, some people suspect that the stone is still related to megalithic culture in Laos, Cambodia, and several areas in Indonesia 2,000 years ago.

According to Ancient Origins, it is not known who made the megalith statue in the Bada Valley.  Megaliths in the Bada Valley are unique and different.

Main Megaliths

See also

 Prehistoric Indonesia
 History of Indonesia
 Culture of Indonesia

Sources
Tarling, Nicholas, The Cambridge history of Southeast Asia: From early times to c.1500, p. 134, Cambridge University Press, 1992,  and 
The Space Wanderer

Valleys of Indonesia
Landforms of Central Sulawesi
Landforms of Sulawesi
Megalithic monuments
Archaeological sites in Indonesia